According to data from the World Bank, Germany has the 14th lowest Gini coefficient in the world. However, since the mid-1990s, income, gender and social inequality in Germany has been rising.

History

Many of the inequalities that Germany is experiencing today can be traced back to the reunification of East and West Germany. It was during this time that Eastern German manufacturing and social constructs lagged behind that of the west. East German policies mainly reflected that of a communist nation since they were being funded and governed by a communist Russian regime. As a result of these policies and regulatory practices, manufacturing in the east struggled during reunification, contributing to the current geographical divide. The gap in manufacturing technology between East and West Germany led to the demise of many East German businesses, leaving many eastern Germans unemployed.

Income and wealth inequality

Since the 1980s, income inequality in Germany has been rising. According to the German think-tank DIW, a typical citizen in the upper 1% of earnings in Germany holds a personal wealth of at least 800,000 euros ($1.09 million), whilst over 25% of all adults have either no wealth or negative wealth due to debt. Germany's Gini coefficient was 0.78 in 2012, compared with 0.68 in France, 0.61 in Italy and 0.45 in Slovakia. A geographical inequality has also been found between the areas of Germany previously known as East Germany and West Germany; on average, an adult in former West Germany has assets worth 94,000 Euros, as compared to a typical adult in the former communist East Germany with just over 40,000 Euros.

Gender inequality
According to Germany's Federal Statistical Office, average gross hourly earnings for women in 2008 were 23.2 percent lower than that of their male counterparts. The average employed female employee in Germany earns 23.1% less than the average male employee, in comparison to 16.4% across the EU. There is also gender division between some industries, with most people in the manufacturing industry in Germany being men and most people in health and social work being women.

Footnotes 

Society of Germany
Social inequality